Dominique du Toit (born 19 May 1997) is an Australian rugby union player.

Career 
Du Toit was born in Maronderra, Zimbabwe. She has represented Australia at the 2014 Summer Youth Olympics and the Commonwealth Youth Games. She also competed at the 2015 Pacific Games in Papua New Guinea.

Du Toit made her debut for the Australian sevens team at the 2016 USA Women's Sevens in Atlanta. She was selected for the Australian squad for the 2016 Olympics as an injury reserve.

Du Toit was named in the Australia squad for the Rugby sevens at the 2020 Summer Olympics. The team came second in the pool round but then lost to Fiji 14-12 in the quarterfinals.

In 2022, Du Toit won a gold medal with the Australian sevens team at the 2022 Commonwealth Games in Birmingham. She was a member of the Australian team that won the 2022 Sevens Rugby World Cup held in Cape Town, South Africa in September 2022.

Personal life 
In 2016 she made a guest appearance as herself on the Australian television show Neighbours.

References

1997 births
Living people
Australian rugby union players
Australian female rugby sevens players
Olympic rugby sevens players of Australia
Rugby sevens players at the 2020 Summer Olympics
Sportspeople from Marondera
Rugby sevens players at the 2014 Summer Youth Olympics
20th-century Australian women
21st-century Australian women
Commonwealth Games silver medallists for Australia
Commonwealth Games medallists in rugby sevens
Rugby sevens players at the 2018 Commonwealth Games
Australian people of Zimbabwean descent
Rugby sevens players at the 2022 Commonwealth Games
Medallists at the 2022 Commonwealth Games